Robert Bundy McDarra (1931– 23 December 1975) variously credited as Robert McDara and  Bob McDara was an Australian stage, television and film actor. He won the 1973 AACTA Award for Best Actor in a Leading Role for his work on the film 27A. With Edward Hepple, Terry McDermott, Walter Sullivan and Ben Gabriel, he was a founding member of the original Q Theatre project in 1963, which, before expanding and moving to Penrith, was a venue offering short plays to office workers at the AMP Theatrette at Circular Quay over lunch times.

McDarra died on 23 December 1975 after a long battle with an unspecified illness

Selected filmography

References

External links

1931 births
1975 deaths
20th-century Australian male actors
Australian male film actors
Australian male stage actors
Australian male television actors
Best Actor AACTA Award winners
Male actors from Sydney